The Shops at Riverside is a two-level enclosed shopping mall, located in Hackensack, in Bergen County, New Jersey, United States, off Route 4, along the Hackensack River. Until 2005, the shopping center was known as Riverside Square Mall.

The Shops at Riverside is a very high-end mall which caters to the affluent suburban areas surrounding Hackensack in Bergen, Essex, and Passaic counties in New Jersey as well as Rockland County in New York State. The mall has 66 stores. The anchor stores are Bloomingdale's, Barnes & Noble, Pottery Barn, and AMC Theatres.

History
Originally a freestanding Bloomingdale's built in 1959, an enclosed mall was opened in 1977, and the shopping center became known as Riverside Square Mall.  The original mall had a Southern California feel, with terra cotta tile, red brick, and skylights.  In 1995, after years of declining traffic and lost tenants and amidst a major renovation and expansion of nearby Westfield Garden State Plaza, The Shops at Riverside was completely renovated with new marble floors, glass railings, and comfortable seating.

From 2005 through 2008, The Shops at Riverside added  of retail and dining space, including 30 new stores and three restaurants.  Much of the space that was added is in a portion of the mall reclaimed from Bloomingdale's.  The original Bloomingdale's Home Store bisected the mall, and was moved to the north end of the existing Bloomingdale's, while the 1977 expansion of Bloomingdale's was renovated in 2005 in preparation for the expansion in 2006. The expansion added three restaurants. It also added a new concourse that linked the north corridor to the south corridor.

Plans for re-purposing the space as a cinema and dining-entertainment complex were announced in May 2015. An AMC Dine-In Theater with nine screening rooms opened in most of the second floor on September 13, 2017.

The second phase of the renovation project include removal of the glass elevator, new flooring, a new set of escalators by Bloomingdale's, a new staircase in the center court, completion of the second floor portion of the mall and a new glass ball near the new movie theater. Most of the construction is expected to be finished by November 2018.

The third phase will include a new mall entrance with valet parking, a luxury lounge, and a coat check and personal shopping service. The Bloomingdales is also expected to be renovated. The third phase will be complete by late 2019.

Blue laws 
Due to highly restrictive Bergen County blue laws, most of the mall is closed on Sundays except for Barnes & Noble, the restaurants, and the movie theater. The mall was an organizer of an unsuccessful 1993 referendum effort to repeal Bergen County's blue laws.

Public transportation
NJ Transit bus lines that serve The Shops at Riverside are the 756 and 762 routes.

The NJ Transit New Bridge Landing train station in River Edge is approximately 5 minutes from the mall.

References

External links
 The Shops at Riverside website
 International Council of Shopping Centers: The Shops at Riverside

1977 establishments in New Jersey
Hackensack, New Jersey
Hackensack River
Shopping malls in New Jersey
Shopping malls established in 1977
Buildings and structures in Bergen County, New Jersey
Tourist attractions in Bergen County, New Jersey
Shopping malls in the New York metropolitan area